Orange Township may refer to:

Illinois
 Orange Township, Clark County, Illinois
 Orange Township, Knox County, Illinois

Indiana
 Orange Township, Fayette County, Indiana
 Orange Township, Noble County, Indiana
 Orange Township, Rush County, Indiana

Iowa
 Orange Township, Black Hawk County, Iowa
 Orange Township, Clinton County, Iowa
 Orange Township, Guthrie County, Iowa
 East Orange Township, Sioux County, Iowa

Kansas
 Orange Township, Lincoln County, Kansas, in Lincoln County, Kansas
 Orange Township, Pawnee County, Kansas, in Pawnee County, Kansas

Michigan
 Orange Township, Ionia County, Michigan
 Orange Township, Kalkaska County, Michigan

Minnesota
 Orange Township, Douglas County, Minnesota

North Dakota
 Orange Township, Adams County, North Dakota

Ohio
 Orange Township, Ashland County, Ohio
 Orange Township, Carroll County, Ohio
 Orange Township, Cuyahoga County, Ohio
 Orange Township, Delaware County, Ohio
 Orange Township, Hancock County, Ohio
 Orange Township, Meigs County, Ohio
 Orange Township, Shelby County, Ohio

Pennsylvania
 Orange Township, Columbia County, Pennsylvania

Township name disambiguation pages